The 1999 Kano State gubernatorial election occurred on January 9, 1999. PDP candidate Rabiu Kwankwaso won the election, defeating APP Magaji Abdullahi and other candidates.

Results
Rabiu Kwankwaso from the PDP won the election. Magaji Abdullahi and AD candidate contested in the election.

The total number of registered voters in the state was 3,680,990, total votes cast was 943,189, valid votes was 908,956 and rejected votes was 34,233.

Rabiu Kwankwaso, (PDP)- 587,619

Magaji Abdullahi, APP- 311,218

AD- 10,119

References 

Kano State gubernatorial elections
Kano State gubernatorial election
Kano State gubernatorial election